In the 1995 Cameroonian Premier League season, 16 teams competed. Racing Bafoussam won the championship.

League standings

References
Cameroon 1995 (RSSSF)

Cam
Cam
1
Elite One seasons